Mert Girmalegesse, formerly Shimelis Girma (Amharic), then Selim Bayrak (Turkish), (born November 30, 1987) is an Ethiopian born Turkish middle and long distance track and field athlete, running in the disciplines of 3000 m, 5000 m and also 10000 m.

Personal life
Born and raised in Ethiopia, he transferred to Turkey for an amount of US$1 million. On May 15, 2008, he received Turkish citizenship and changed his name to Selim Bayrak. Two years later, he took the name Mert and changed his surname to Gırmalegese, his family's name in Ethiopia. For the reason of the repeated name change he stated that he wants to safeguard interests in his country of origin.

Sports career
In 2008, he won the 5000 m at the 2008 European Cup First League group B competitions in Istanbul. In the same year he was third at the European Cross Country Championships in his own age category of men under 23 years (U23).

He finished eleventh in the 10000 m at the 2008 Summer Olympics in Beijing with 27:29.33 and did not start in the 5000 m qualification heat 3.

In 2009, he won the 10000 m at the 2009 European Athletics U23 Championships in Kaunas and also won bronze in the 10000 m at the 2009 Mediterranean Games in Pescara.

At the 2009 European Athletics Indoor Championships he competed in 3000 m and finished fifth in Torino.

He is a member of the Fenerbahçe S.K. athletics club.

Personal bests

NR National record

Performance progression

References

External links

1987 births
Living people
Olympic athletes of Turkey
Athletes (track and field) at the 2008 Summer Olympics
Turkish people of Ethiopian descent
Naturalized citizens of Turkey
Ethiopian male long-distance runners
Fenerbahçe athletes
Turkish male long-distance runners
Turkish male middle-distance runners
Ethiopian emigrants to Turkey
Mediterranean Games bronze medalists for Turkey
Athletes (track and field) at the 2009 Mediterranean Games
Mediterranean Games medalists in athletics